Somalia national bandy team represents Somalia in the Bandy World Championship. It is controlled by the Somali National Bandy Association, which is a member of the Federation of International Bandy. The squad participated in the 2014 Bandy World Championship in Irkutsk, Russia, the first team from Africa to take part in bandy competitions. They participated in all following tournaments as well, consistently taking the last position.

Background 
All selected players, except an ice hockey player living in Canada, are Somali nationals who live in the Swedish town of Borlänge and play for the local club Borlänge Bandy (Borlänge-Stora Tuna BK, later renamed Peace & Love City). The team is coached by former Swedish international Per Fosshaug. Somalia national bandy team is financed by the municipality of Borlänge and Somali Olympic Committee. The project was launched in May 2013 and the team planned already by then to participate in at least two World Championship tournaments. This has been reported in media from around the world.

In the 2014 Bandy World Championship, the Somalia squad played in the Group D of Division B with Germany, Japan, Mongolia, and Ukraine. The tournament was played between 26 January and 2 February. In the first game, they lost to Germany 1–22, and consequently scored their first WCS goal. They subsequently lost all other games, scoring one more goal against Mongolia, and then one more in play-offs against Ukraine.

In 2016 and 2017, Somalia has also played friendlies against an unofficial Afghanistan national bandy team. The Afghan team is created by Afghan ex-pats in Karlstad, Sweden, but is not sanctioned by the sports governing bodies in Afghanistan, so it is not allowed to take part in the World Championship.

Team 2014 squad 
Somali squad at the 2014 World Championship in Irkutsk, Russia, 26 January – 2 February 2014.

References

External links
 China - Somalia game of 3 Feb 2015 at Youtube from the 2015 Bandy World Championship (the game starts about 5:10 in)
 Somalia - the Netherlands game of 1 Feb 2015 at Youtube from the 2015 Bandy World Championship (the game starts about 4:55 in)

National bandy teams
Bandy
Bandy in Somalia